Guadalupe is a municipality of Spain located in the province of Cáceres, Extremadura. It has a total area of 68.19km2 and, as of 1 January 2021, a registered population of 1,822. The monastery of Santa María de Guadalupe is situated here.

Geography 
The Guadalupe River has its origins near the town in the Sierra de las Villuercas. Its highest point, the Pico la Villuerca reaches an altitude of 1603 m.

See also

 Monastery of Santa María de Guadalupe

References

Municipalities in the Province of Cáceres
Our Lady of Guadalupe